Idanda was a king of Qatna in the middle of the 14th century BC. An archive of tablets discovered in the royal palace mention him with the name Idanda while in other sources he is mentioned as Idadda. His name is Amorite, and he claimed to be the son of a king named Ulašuda whose position in Qatna is uncertain. His son was named Amut-pa-īl.

References

Citations

Sources

14th-century BC rulers
Amorite kings
Qatna
14th-century BC people